Jiujiang, formerly transliterated Kiukiang or Kew Keang, is a prefecture-level city located on the southern shores of the Yangtze River in northwest Jiangxi Province, People's Republic of China.  It is the second-largest prefecture-level city in Jiangxi province. Jiujiang literally means "nine rivers".

It is one of the first five cities open to foreign trade along the Yangtze River after Chinese Reform and Opening policy. It is Yangtze River shipping hub international gateway, and Jiangxi's only international trade port city. Jiujiang Port is the fourth largest port on the Yangtze River.

Its population was 4,600,276 inhabitants at the 2020 census whom 1,164,268 in the built up area made of 3 urban districts (Xunyang, Lianxi, and Chaisang). In 2007, the city is named China's top ten livable cities by Chinese Cities Brand Value Report, which was released at 2007 Beijing Summit of China Cities Forum. In 2022, State Council of China granted Jiujiang the title of National Historical and Cultural City for its rich history and multiculture background in the Republic of China era.

Administrative divisions

 Districts:
Xunyang District
Lianxi District
Chaisang District
 Counties:
Wuning County
Xiushui County
Yongxiu County
De'an County
Duchang County
Hukou County
Pengze County
 County-level city:
Ruichang
Gongqingcheng. Directly administered as a sub-prefecture-level city since 1 July 2014.
Lushan
 Others:
 Bureau and Administration Committees
 Mountain Lu Scenic Area Administration Bureau
 Mountain Lu West Sea Scenic Area Management Committee
 Bali Lake New Area Management Committee
 Poyang Lake Ecological Science and Technology City Management Committee

 Towns and Sub-district Offices
 There are 235 towns and 11 sub-district offices

History

Ancient history
In ancient times it was told that nine rivers converged near where Jiujiang sprang up to become Jiangxi's main water port today. During the Xia through the Shang Dynasties the capitals of several states were located in area of Jiujiang. In the Spring & Autumn Period (770–476 BCE) Jiujiang bordered between the states of Wu (downstream, to the east) and Chu (upstream, to the west).

Imperial history
Tao Yuanming (365–429 CE) a famous Chinese philosopher lived at the base of Mountain Lu. He was once appointed magistrate of nearby Pengze County and after 83 days resigned due to the politics involved in administering justice. He retired back to his village to pen an essay called "Peach Blossom Spring". In 757, Li Bai (701–762 CE) was implicated in An-Shi disturbances and imprisoned at Jiujiang. Bai Juyi (772–846 CE) wrote a poem called "Lute Song", which is about his sadness and isolation of forced exile as a middle rank official to reside in such a small town. In the 13th century Zhu Xi was a Confucian philosopher who practiced at the White Deer Grotto Academy, on Mountain Lu's eastern flanks.

Jiujiang has also been known as Jiangzhou and Xunyang in former times. During the Jin Dynasty (266–420) it was known as Sin Yang, the Liang dynasty (502–557) it was called Jiangzhou. The Sui Dynasty saw its name as Jiujiang and the Song Dynasty (960–1127) called it Ting Jiang. The Ming dynasty (1368–1644), gave it Jiujiang which has retained its name to this day. It was a Taiping rebellion stronghold for five years (1850–1864) after they devastated the town to only leave one street with buildings intact. The city served as the capital of Taiping's Jiangxi province during this time.

British concession and European settlement history

The Arrival of the Europeans
A member of Lord Elgin's committee arriving in 1858 to survey Chinese ports for treaty status noted: "We found it to the last degree deplorable." A single dilapidated street, composed only of a few mean shops, was all that existed of this once thriving populous city. The remainder of the vast area composed within its massive walls 9-10 kilometers in circumference, contained nothing but ruins, weeds and kitchen gardens. 
After Jiujiang becoming an open treaty port in 1862, it was exporting Jiangxi's vast rice crop. In 1904, more than 160,000 kilos of opium were moved through its customs house. The New York Methodist Mission Society's Superintendent, Virgil C. Hart, arrived in Kiukiang in 1866 and bought a piece of property just east of the city wall. This is where the city's first Methodist Church and western hospital was built, with the hospital renamed the No. 1 Hospital, and the oldest/continuous operating hospital in Jiangxi Province. In 1896 Drs. Mary Stone (Shi Meiyu) and Ida Kahn (Kahn Cheng) arrived back in Jiujiang, being China's first two native female western-educated doctors; having graduated from the University of Michigan Medical School. They were provided with funds collected by Dr. I. N. Danforth (from Chicago residents), to build the Elizabeth Skelton Danforth Hospital and administered entirely by the native Chinese. This was later renamed Jiujiang Women's and Children's Hospital, and the nursing education by Drs. Stone and Kahn would later be the impetus for the founding of Jiujiang University and Jiujiang Medical School.

It became one of the three centers of the tea trade in China along with Hankou and Fuzhou.  The Russians had two brick tea producing factories, but ceased operations after 1917. On October 16, 1927, there was an explosion of ammunition on the Chinese troopship Kuang Yuang near Jiujiang. The British surrendered their concession in 1927 after being robbed and its Chinese workers mutineered their posts to the marauding crowds. An economic recession had set in over the decades as Indian and Chelonian tea made for greater competition. A military advance was being staged upriver in Wuhan by the Kuomintang in 1927 and all the remaining expatriate community fled on British and American warships towards safer waters of Shanghai, to never return. Jiujiang languished as a port and much of its export trade was siphoned off with the connecting of Nanchang to coastal rail lines built in 1936–37.

The Establishment of British Concession

After China's defeat in the Second Opium War, China and Britain signed the Treaty of Tientsin. At the beginning of the eleventh year of Xianfeng (1861), the British Counsellor, Harry Parkes, went to the new port on the Yangtse River by naval vessel according to the treaty to investigate the situation and select the site of concession to be opened. After the concession sites of Zhenjiang and Hankou were delimit, on March 22, Harry Parkes returned to Jiujiang from Hankou and decided to open up a commercial port in Jiujiang.

In the 11th year of xianfeng (1861), Zhang Jixin, general minister of Jiangxi province, signed with Harry Parkers the treaty of opening up the British concession in Jiujiang, the Treaty of Land Lease in Jiujiang. The concession was located in a narrow area on the west of Jiujiang, between the Yangtze River and Gantang Lake, to the west of Longkai River, with a length of 150 zhang from east to west and a depth of 60 zhang from south to north, covering an area of 150 acres. The southern part of the concession includes part of PenPu Port.

The Development of Kuling in Mountain Lu

In the early 20th century, Kuling on top of Mountain Lu became the summer resort for international residents because of its beautiful geological landscape and nice climate. At the golden age, over 4000 foreigners from America and European countries lived in this small town in summer time.

Kuling, on the slopes of a wide valley of Mountain Lu, was established in 1895 by the missionaries Edward Selby Little, Dr. Edgerton Haskell Hart and three others, as a sanitarium and rest resort for Western missionaries in southern China. They built their houses in the colonial style of architecture, and added churches, schools, and sports facilities. It was named by Little, as a pun: it is wonderfully cooling after the summer heat in the plains below. It was also a word that sounded conveniently Chinese to the local people, and has been adopted by them. Kuling was run by the missionaries in a Kuling Council that sold the plots of the land and with the proceeds paid for local services and security. In 1910, Caroline Maddock Hart and four others met to found the Nurses Association of China; with Caroline Maddock Hart being its first president.

Modern history
Until 1949 Jiujiang had very little industry except for local handicrafts. Manufacturing is Jiujiang's backbone today with auto, machinery, petrochemical, shipbuilding and textiles as its cornerstones. After the completion of the Yangtze River Bridge in 1992 and the Beijing to Kowloon (Hong Kong) and Wuhan to Shanghai rail systems laid, a convenient ground corridor was provided and a regional airport now serves most of China's capital cities.

In 2005, an earthquake hit Ruichang. Kuling American School Association donated 200 sets of desks and chairs and more than 50 sets of Oxford English-Chinese Dictionary to a local primary school near Ruichang.

Economy

Economic and Technological Development Zones
Jiujiang Free Trade (Tariff-free) Zone
Jiujiang National Economical and Technological Development Zone 
Jiujiang Gongqingcheng National High-tech Industrial Development Zone

Latest Ranking in the Chinese Cities
In 2021, Jiujiang's GDP is 373.528 Billion Yuan. Jiujiang's GDP ranks 70th among all Chinese cities.

Demography
The city administers a total population of approximately 4,600,276 at the 2020 census of whom approximately 2,814,240 are urban living in the urban area. The population density is 240 per km2. Han Chinese make up 99.8% of the population. Registered residents include 25 ethnic minorities. Six of them are major minorities in Jiujiang. They are: Hui, Miao, Zhuang, Tujia, and She.

Jiujiang dialect is unlike typical Gan dialect of Jiangxi. Jiujiang dialect is a variety of Lower Yangtze Mandarin and is close to Wu languages.

Climate

Industry
Primary industries include:
 Manufacturing
 Petrochemical Refinement
 Tourism 
 Import/Export (through river port)
 Agricultural Chemical Production

Transport

Road 

G56 Hangzhou–Ruili Expressway
G70 Fuzhou–Yinchuan Expressway
Jiujiang Ring Expressway
Chang-Jiu Expressway
Jiu-Rui Expressway
G45 Daguang Expressway
Yongwu Expressway
Penghu Expressway
Xiu-ping Expressway
Du-Jiu Expressway
Dong-jiu Expressway

Rail

Beijing-Kowloon
Tongling–Jiujiang
Hefei–Jiujiang
Wuhan–Jiujiang
Nanchang–Jiujiang Intercity Railway
Chang-jiu intercity railway
Wu-jiu high speed railway
Jiujing-qu railway
He-an-Jiu passenger dedicated line
Fu-gang-jiu passenger dedicated line
Chang-jiu high speed railway.

Air

Jiujiang Lushan Airport (JIU)

Port
Jiujiang Port is the largest port in Jiangxi Province located at the junction of the Yangtze River, Poyang Lake and the Beijing-Kowloon Railway. From west to east, this port consists of five docks namely Ruichang, Chengxi, Chengqu, Hukou and Pengze. As an important port situated on the lower and middle reaches of Yangtze River and one of the 5 main ports on the river, many domestic and international marine routes have been established, In the main, the freight handled consists of mineral building materials, coals, metal and nonmetal ores and petroleum.

Yangtze Bridges
At present, Jiujiang has two Bridges built across the Yangtze River. They are Jiujiang Yangtze River Bridge and Jiujiang Yangtze River Expressway Bridge. The third bridge across the Yangtze River in Jiujiang is under construction. The fourth bridge across the Yangtze River in Jiujiang is being designed

Colleges and universities

 University of Jiujiang: a university located in Lianxi District. The location is most easily reached by the 101 bus from the city center.
 Jiangxi Vocational College of Finance and Economics: a small picturesque college located right by the lake. This college is well situated within the city.
 Jiujiang Vocational and Technical College: a vocational college located in Lianxi District near University of Jiujiang.
 Jiujiang Vocational University: a vocational college located in Lianxi District near University of Jiujiang.
 Jiangxi Fenglin College: a vocational college located in Yongxiu county.Yongxiu county belongs to Jiujiang.
 Jiujiang Vocational College of Polytechnic: a vocational college located in Jiujiang Economic and Technological Development Zone.
 Gongqing Institute of Science and Technology: a vocational college located in Gongqingcheng. Gongqingcheng belongs to Jiujiang.
 Gongqing College of Nanchang University: a local college located in Gongqingcheng.
 Science and Technology College of Jiangxi Normal University: a local college located in Gongqingcheng.
 Modern Economics and Management College of Jiangxi Finance and Economics University: a local college located in Gongqingcheng.
 Science and Technology College of Nanchang Aviation University: a vocational college located in Gongqingcheng.
 Science and Technology College of Nanchang University: a local college located in Gongqingcheng.
 Nanchang Business College of Jiangxi Agriculture University: a local vocational college located in Gongqingcheng.

International relations

Former Diplomatic Representives in Jiujiang
British Consulate General Jiujiang was established in 1861
Japanese Consulate General Jiujiang was established on July 16, 1915

Twin towns — Sister cities

Jiujiang is twinned with:

 Baw Baw, Australia
 Chios, Greece
 Jeongseon, South Korea
 Kajaani, Finland
 Koper, Slovenia
 Legionowo, Poland
 Louisville, United States
 La Plata, Argentina
 Queimados, Brazil
 Redbridge, England, United Kingdom
 Savannah, United States
 Serowe, Botswana
 Tamano, Japan

Tourism

Mountain Lu: one of the most famous mountains in China. It is located in the south of the urban center and listed as a World Heritage Site.
Mountain Lu Geopark: is located on Mountain Lu. In 1996, Mountain Lu became a UNESCO World Heritage Site. In 2004, the Mountain Lu Geopark became a member of Global Geoparks Network.  Mountain Lu Geopark is a place of striking beauty. It has spectacular peaks, lakes, cliffs, waterfalls and important Buddhist and Taoist temples. 
Kuling: as a homonym for cooling. It is a mountain town in the Mountain Lu National Park. It was established in 1895 by the missionaries Edward Selby Little, Dr. Edgerton Haskell Hart and three others, as a sanitarium and summer resort for Western missionaries in southern China.
British Concession Museum: located on Binjiang road. It was established by local government from transforming buildings left from the former British Concession of Jiujiang.
Yuliang South Road Historical and Cultural Block: a street combines Chinese and Western cultures. Beside the street are:
the old Catholic school
the old monastery
the Catholic church
Taling Park
the old Perkins Villa
Nengren temple
Western Goods Exhibition Window
Lushan Hotspring: located in Hotspring town, Lushan City. Lushan City is a county-level city belong to Jiujiang.
Haiyun Sand Beach: located in Balihu Park. It is the only high standard man-made beach in Jiangxi Province. It is a famous scenic spot and entertainment resort in Jiujiang.
Xunyang River Scenic Area: located on Binjiang Road in Xunyang District. It is near shoreline of the Yangtze River. Covering an area of some 765 acres (around 509,490 sqm), with distance of 5.2 km long from east to west. It is only 4.5 km away from Jiujiang Station, 1.6 km away from Fuzhou-Yinchuan Expressway, and about an hour's drive from Changbei Airport. Its rich tourism resources include river, ancient building, garden and museum as follows:
Pipa Pavilion 
Xunyang Tower 
Suojiang Pagoda 
British Concession Museum 
Baishui Lake Park 
Xunyang River Cruise Ship
Mountain Lu West Sea: is located about 90 kilometers to the south of Mountain Lu. It is National 5-Star Scenic Spot. There are thousands of islands in the area just like Maldives. In 2007, between June and August, American reality program Survivor filmed its fifteenth season, Survivor: China, in the area. The program host Jeff Probst claimed that this was the first American television series filmed entirely in China.
Nanshan Park: completed in early 2013. This park, home to a new pagoda, is covered in flora and lights up the Jiujiang sky at night.
Yanshui Pavilion: located in city center, near Gantang lake. It is a well known scenic spot in Jiujiang.
Donglin Temple: a Buddhist temple located at foot of Mountain Lu. It is built by Huiyuan (Buddhist), founder of Pure Land Buddhism. Pure Land Buddhism later spread to Japan and gained its prominence there. In 1175, Hōnen established Pure Land Buddhism as an independent sect in Japan known as Jōdo-shū. Pure Land schools have nearly 40 percent of Japanese Buddhism practitioners, only second to Chan schools. 
The temple provide free vegetarian lunch and free guest house. Visitors can stay at guest house in temple for free up to three days. The guest house is gender separated, and visitors have to share room with others. 
Donglin Buddha: the world's tallest statue of Amitabha Buddha. Total cost is about 1 billion Yuan. Surface of the Buddha is plated with 48 kilograms of gold. Buddha height is 48 meters tall, representing the forty-eighth vows of Amitabha Buddha. Total height is 81 meters.
Mountain Lu Four Seasons Flower City (Botanical Garden): located in Bali lake New Area. It is Jiujiang's largest flower plant park.
Stone Bell Hill: just downriver from Jiujiang is Hukou where the Yangtze River and waters of Boyang Lake converge with an abrupt color change. People have been coming here for centuries to listen to the stone-bell sound resonating from the cliffs overlooking this spot. A few theories are provided why this rare geographical phenomenon happens. Li Daoyuan from the Northern Wei period (386-534) theorizes that it is because the hill has a bell-shaped appearance and hollow inside, thus providing the sound when struck. Or it may be because of the water lapping within the limestone nooks and fissures around its base, as famous litterateur from the same time Su Shui discovered. Su Dongpo also did three trips around its perimeter, before settling on this last explanation for its unique sound also. Many Chinese literati's have left more than twenty calligraphy masterpieces carved upon its rocks, with some dating back to the Tang dynasty (618-907 CE).

Notable residents
Mary Stone (Shi Meiyu) (1873-1954), one of the first western trained Chinese female physicians. Founder of Elizabeth Skelton Danforth Hospital (now called Jiujiang Women and Children's Hospital) in Jiujiang.
Lo-Yi Chang (1907-1988), was born in Kuling, Mountain Lu. She was spouse of T.V. Soong, then Premier of the Republic of China. She has made a significant contribution to the promotion of China overseas.
Pearl S. Buck (1892-1973), was the first American woman won Nobel Prize in Literature, for her rich and truly epic descriptions of peasant life in China, in 1938. She also won Pulitzer Prize in 1932. She spent her childhood with her family in Kuling in summer time. Her father built a stone villa in Kuling in 1897, and lived there until his death in 1931.
 (松浦正人) (1942- ), born in Jiujiang. He was a Japanese politician. He served as Hōfu mayor and president of National Mayors Association of Japan. In 2018, then Hōfu mayor and president of National Mayors Association of Japan (NMAJ), Masato Matsuura (松浦正人), led a delegation of NMAJ visited 
former Japanese consulate of Jiujiang.
Masato Matsuura said :I was born in the former Japanese consulate of Jiujiang. Jiujiang is my second hometown. I am deeply attached to the beautiful landscape here.

Chiang Yee (1903 - 1977), born in Jiujiang. He was a Chinese poet, author, painter and calligrapher. His translation of Coca Cola is remembered by all Chinese.
Mervyn Peake (1911-1968), born in Kuling, Mountain Lu. He was an English writer, artist, poet, and illustrator. He was well known for being the illustrator of Alice's Adventures in Wonderland.
 Maggie Mac Neil (2000- ), born in Jiujiang and adopted to Canada at an early age
Sylvia Wu (1915–2022), born in Kiukiang and later became a Los Angeles restaurateur and a writer.

External links

 People's Government of Jiujiang (Chinese language) 
 Mountain Lu Website (Chinese language) 
 Jiujiang News Network (Chinese language) 
 Kuling American School Association

References

 
Cities in Jiangxi
Prefecture-level divisions of Jiangxi
Port cities and towns in China
Populated places on the Yangtze River